George Richard Lawley Gibbs, 2nd Baron Wraxall  (16 May 1928 – 19 July 2001), who used the forename Richard, was a British peer.

Early life and background
Gibbs succeeded his father, George Gibbs, 1st Baron Wraxall, in the barony on 28 October 1931 at the age of three. His mother was the Honourable Ursula Mary Lawley, and his godmother was Queen Mary of Teck.

Kidnapping
In 1988, Lord Wraxall was kidnapped at his home Tyntesfield and locked in the boot of his BMW for almost seven hours. Afterwards according to The Times, he said "Good grief, there's more room in the back than I ever thought". The kidnappers had knocked him to the ground, one battering him on the head with a plank, and demanded the combination to his safe and his house keys, but the burglar alarm went off and, in a panic, the raiders bundled Lord Wraxall into the boot of his car and drove him to woods about two miles away, before making off with his wallet and credit cards.

Later life and death
Wraxall was appointed to be a Deputy Lieutenant of the County of Somerset by the Lord Lieutenant in 1996. He died unmarried in July 2001, aged 73, and was succeeded by his younger brother, Sir Eustace Gibbs.

See also
List of kidnappings
List of solved missing person cases

References

External links

1928 births
2001 deaths
2
Richard
Kidnapped British people
Wraxall